Richard Alan Guy  (born 6 April 1941) is a New Zealand former international rugby union player and rugby administrator.

Playing career
He played four test matches for New Zealand, the All Blacks, in 1971—all against the touring British Lions. He also played five non-Test matches in a domestic tour of New Zealand by the national team in 1972.
Provincially he played for North Auckland (now Northland) between 1966 and 1974, before becoming involved in rugby as an administrator.

Administration
By 1981 he was chairman of the North Auckland union, and joined the New Zealand Rugby Football Union (NZRFU, now New Zealand Rugby) council in 1984. He was team manager for the All Blacks in 1986 and 1987, including during their successful 1987 Rugby World Cup campaign. He continued as an administrator, including as chairman of the NZRFU in 1995 and 1996 when the game was transitioning to professionalism, until 2001 when he was unseated from the board. His chairmanship in 1995 and 1996 was particularly significant, the NZRFU formed a consortium (SANZAR) with the national unions of Australia and South Africa in order to administer two new competitions: Super 12 and the Tri-Nations Championship. The significant broadcast revenue from the new competitions forced the International Rugby Board to abolish their regulations regarding amateurism and sanction full professionalism.

In 2002 Guy was made the first life member, for "exceptional service", of the New Zealand Rugby Union. In the 2012 Queen's Birthday and Diamond Jubilee Honours, for his services to rugby, Guy was appointed an Officer of the New Zealand Order of Merit.

References

Sources 
 
 
 
 
 

1941 births
Living people
New Zealand international rugby union players
New Zealand rugby union players
New Zealand Rugby Football Union officials
Officers of the New Zealand Order of Merit
Rugby union props
Northland rugby union players
Rugby union players from Lower Hutt